Vinnie Bennett (born September 11, 1992) is a New Zealand actor.

Filmography

Film

TV series

Video game

References

External links
 

1993 births
Living people
New Zealand male film actors
New Zealand male television actors
People from Christchurch